Nesah-ye Allahdad (also Romanized as Nesah-ye Allahdād; also known as Nesā-ye ‘Olyā) is a village in Sepidar Rural District, in the Central District of Boyer-Ahmad County, Kohgiluyeh and Boyer-Ahmad Province, Iran. At the 2006 census, its population was 144, in 32 families.

References 

Populated places in Boyer-Ahmad County